The 1958–59 season was Aberdeen's 46th season in the top flight of Scottish football and their 48th season of club. Aberdeen competed in the Scottish League Division One, Scottish League Cup, and the Scottish Cup

Results

Division 1

Final standings

Scottish League Cup

Group 4

Group 4 final table

Scottish Cup

References

AFC Heritage Trust

Aberdeen F.C. seasons
Aber